Welsh Presbyterian Church may refer to:

in the United Kingdom
The Presbyterian Church of Wales
Welsh Presbyterian Church (Liverpool), also known as Toxteth Cathedral

in the United States
Welsh Presbyterian Church (Los Angeles), listed as a Los Angeles Historic-Cultural Monument
Welsh Presbyterian Church (Columbus, Ohio), listed on the National Register of Historic Places in (NRHP) Franklin County
Welsh Presbyterian Church (Plana, South Dakota), NRHP-listed in Brown County